The 1992 Nigerian Senate election in Abia State was held on July 4, 1992, to elect members of the Nigerian Senate to represent Abia State. Emmanuel Chiedoziem Nwaka representing Abia North and Onyeka Amadi Okoroafor representing Abia Central won on the platform of National Republican Convention, while Mac Onyemachi Nwulu representing Abia South won on the platform of the Social Democratic Party.

Overview

Summary

Results

Abia North 
The election was won by Emmanuel Chiedoziem Nwaka of the National Republican Convention.

Abia Central 
The election was won by Onyeka Amadi Okoroafor of the National Republican Convention.

Abia South 
The election was won by Mac Onyemachi Nwulu of the Social Democratic Party.

References 

July 1992 events in Nigeria
Abi
Abia State Senate elections